Heßheim is a former Verbandsgemeinde ("collective municipality") in the district Rhein-Pfalz-Kreis, in Rhineland-Palatinate, Germany. On 1 July 2014 it merged into the new Verbandsgemeinde Lambsheim-Heßheim. 

The seat of the Verbandsgemeinde was in Heßheim.

The Verbandsgemeinde Heßheim consisted of the following Ortsgemeinden ("local municipalities"):

*seat of the Verbandsgemeinde

Former Verbandsgemeinden in Rhineland-Palatinate